The five Tarokoid languages are a branch of the Plateau family spoken in central Nigeria, just north of the middle reaches of the Benue River. Tarok itself has 300,000 speakers, with Pe and Sur about 5,000 each. Yangkam is severely endangered, being spoken by around fifty elderly men.

The Tarokoid languages have significantly influenced the Ron languages and later Ngas, but not the other West Chadic languages of Tel, Goemai, Mupun, and Mwaghavul. Most borrowed words went from Tarok to Chadic, although occasionally Chadic words were also borrowed into Tarok. Today, Tarok remains the lingua franca of the southern Plateau region of Nigeria.

Classification
The only language with significant data is Tarok. Pe (Pai) has been placed in various branches of Plateau, and Kwang (Kwanka) was only recently added, but it now seems clear that the following five languages belong together. The classification below follows Blench (2004).

Names and locations
Below is a list of Tarokoid language names, populations, and locations from Blench (2019).

Reconstruction
Reconstructed Proto-Tarokoid forms proposed by Longtau (2016):

Footnotes

References
Blench (2008) Prospecting proto-Plateau. Manuscript.

External links
Roger Blench: Tarokoid materials
Plateau materials from Roger Blench

 
Plateau languages